Joseph Gibson (1823-1886) was an Americo-Liberian politician born in the United States. 

Gibson was born in 1823 as a free black resident of Talbot County, Maryland. Gibson and several other family members emigrated to West Africa in 1835 under the auspices of the Maryland State Colonization Society. Gibson was an active leader in the community and became a leader in the Maryland Colony, which eventually achieved independence. Gibson served on the nine-person constitutional committee of The Independent State of Maryland in Liberia which based the constitution off of those of the United States and the U.S. state of Maryland. In June 1854, Gibson was appointed to the country's senate. However, the independent state feared attacks from the indigenous residents of the area and, in 1857, voted to join the independent Republic of Liberia. 

Gibson was named the first superintendent of Maryland County, Liberia. From January 6, 1868, to January 3, 1870, Gibson served was the seventh vice president of Liberia under President James Spriggs Payne. He was a member of the Republican Party.

References

1823 births
1886 deaths
Americo-Liberian people
Vice presidents of Liberia
People from Maryland County
Republican Party (Liberia) politicians
19th-century Liberian politicians
19th-century African-American people